Rita Aciro is a Ugandan human rights defender and executive director for Uganda Women's Network (UWONET). She was the recipient of the 2021 European Union Human Rights Defenders Award.

Background and Education 
Aciro started her school life at Reparatrix Boarding school in Bugonge Entebbe, she thereafter joined Kololo secondary school for her secondary school education.

She entered Uganda women's network (UWONET) as an intern in 1997.

Career 
Aciro has worked with communities and governments in East Africa on issues concerning girls and women leadership, women land rights, combating gender based violence, women peace building, civic and voter education plus election observation.

She has over 20 years of experience being at the forefront of advocacy and campaigning on the rights of women and girls.

In 2021 the European Union Human Rights Defenders Award, awarded annually to a Ugandan human rights defender, recognized her contribution to the rights of women and girls in Uganda and promotion of human rights and democratic values.

References 

Living people
Ugandan human rights activists
Date of birth missing (living people)
Ugandan women activists
Year of birth missing (living people)